Mitchell Devon Henry (born 2 September 2003) is an English footballer who plays as a centre-forward for North West Counties Premier Division club Irlam.

Playing career
After coming through the Bolton Wanderers Reserves Academy, Henry made his Bolton debut on 20 November 2020 in a 3–2 against Newcastle United U21 in the EFL Trophy, coming on as a late substitute for Shaun Miller. On 31 August 2021, he made his first appearance against a professional team in a 3–2 win against Port Vale also in the EFL Trophy when he came on as a late substitute for Elias Kachunga. On 30 April 2022, he announced he had not been offered a profesional contract by Bolton and as such would be leaving when his contract expired on June 30. He signed for Irlam for the 2022–23 season.

Statistics

References

2003 births
Living people
Association football forwards
English footballers
Bolton Wanderers F.C. players
English Football League players
Footballers from Salford
Irlam F.C. players
North West Counties Football League players